S.M.A. Majeed was a Member of the 4th National Assembly of Pakistan as a representative of East Pakistan.

Career
Majeed was a Member of the  4th National Assembly of Pakistan representing fgh. In parliament he raised the demand for an airport in Khulna to the Minister of Defence.

References

Pakistani MNAs 1965–1969
Living people
Year of birth missing (living people)